Inductance is the tendency of an electrical conductor to oppose a change in the electric current flowing through it.  The flow of electric current creates a magnetic field around the conductor. The field strength depends on the magnitude of the current, and follows any changes in current. From Faraday's law of induction, any change in magnetic field through a circuit induces an electromotive force (EMF) (voltage) in the conductors, a process known as electromagnetic induction. This induced voltage created by the changing current has the effect of opposing the change in current. This is stated by Lenz's law, and the voltage is called back EMF.

Inductance is defined as the ratio of the induced voltage to the rate of change of current causing it.  It is a proportionality factor that depends on the geometry of circuit conductors and the magnetic permeability of nearby materials.  An electronic component designed to add inductance to a circuit is called an inductor.  It typically consists of a coil or helix of wire.

The term inductance was coined by Oliver Heaviside in May 1884. It is customary to use the symbol  for inductance, in honour of the physicist Heinrich Lenz. In the SI system, the unit of inductance is the henry (H), which is the amount of inductance that causes a voltage of one volt, when the current is changing at a rate of one ampere per second. It is named for Joseph Henry, who discovered inductance independently of Faraday.

History 

The history of electromagnetic induction, a facet of electromagnetism, began with observations of the ancients: electric charge or static electricity (rubbing silk on amber), electric current (lightning), and magnetic attraction (lodestone). Understanding the unity of these forces of nature, and the scientific theory of electromagnetism began in the late 18th century.

Electromagnetic induction was first described by Michael Faraday in 1831. In Faraday's experiment, he wrapped two wires around opposite sides of an iron ring. He expected that, when current started to flow in one wire, a sort of wave would travel through the ring and cause some electrical effect on the opposite side. Using a galvanometer, he observed a transient current flow in the second coil of wire each time that a battery was connected or disconnected from the first coil. This current was induced by the change in magnetic flux that occurred when the battery was connected and disconnected. Faraday found several other manifestations of electromagnetic induction. For example, he saw transient currents when he quickly slid a bar magnet in and out of a coil of wires, and he generated a steady (DC) current by rotating a copper disk near the bar magnet with a sliding electrical lead ("Faraday's disk").

Source of inductance 
A current  flowing through a conductor generates a magnetic field around the conductor, which is described by Ampere's circuital law.  The total magnetic flux  through a circuit is equal to the product of the perpendicular component of the magnetic flux density and the area of the surface spanning the current path. If the current varies, the magnetic flux  through the circuit changes. By Faraday's law of induction, any change in flux through a circuit induces an electromotive force (EMF) in the circuit, proportional to the rate of change of flux

The negative sign in the equation indicates that the induced voltage is in a direction which opposes the change in current that created it; this is called Lenz's law. The potential is therefore called a back EMF. If the current is increasing, the voltage is positive at the end of the conductor through which the current enters and negative at the end through which it leaves, tending to reduce the current. If the current is decreasing, the voltage is positive at the end through which the current leaves the conductor, tending to maintain the current. Self-inductance, usually just called inductance,  is the ratio between the induced voltage and the rate of change of the current

Thus, inductance is a property of a conductor or circuit, due to its magnetic field, which tends to oppose changes in current through the circuit. The unit of inductance in the SI system is the henry (H), named after Joseph Henry, which is the amount of inductance which generates a voltage of one volt when the current is changing at a rate of one ampere per second.

All conductors have some inductance, which may have either desirable or detrimental effects in practical electrical devices. The inductance of a circuit depends on the geometry of the current path, and on the magnetic permeability of nearby materials; ferromagnetic materials with a higher permeability like iron near a conductor tend to increase the magnetic field and inductance.  Any alteration to a circuit which increases the flux (total magnetic field) through the circuit produced by a given current increases the inductance, because inductance is also equal to the ratio of magnetic flux to current

An inductor is an electrical component consisting of a conductor shaped to increase the magnetic flux, to add inductance to a circuit.  Typically it consists of a wire wound into a coil or helix.  A coiled wire has a higher inductance than a straight wire of the same length, because the magnetic field lines pass through the circuit multiple times, it has multiple flux linkages.  The inductance is proportional to the square of the number of turns in the coil, assuming full flux linkage.

The inductance of a coil can be increased by placing a magnetic core of ferromagnetic material in the hole in the center.  The magnetic field of the coil magnetizes the material of the core, aligning its magnetic domains, and the magnetic field of the core adds to that of the coil, increasing the flux through the coil.  This is called a ferromagnetic core inductor.  A magnetic core can increase the inductance of a coil by thousands of times.

If multiple electric circuits are located close to each other, the magnetic field of one can pass through the other; in this case the circuits are said to be inductively coupled. Due to Faraday's law of induction, a change in current in one circuit can cause a change in magnetic flux in another circuit and thus induce a voltage in another circuit. The concept of inductance can be generalized in this case by defining the mutual inductance  of circuit  and circuit  as the ratio of voltage induced in circuit  to the rate of change of current in circuit . This is the principle behind a transformer.  The property describing the effect of one conductor on itself is more precisely called self-inductance, and the properties describing the effects of one conductor with changing current on nearby conductors is called mutual inductance.

Self-inductance and magnetic energy 
If the current through a conductor with inductance is increasing, a voltage  is induced across the conductor with a polarity that opposes the current—in addition to any voltage drop caused by the conductor's resistance. The charges flowing through the circuit lose potential energy. The energy from the external circuit required to overcome this "potential hill" is stored in the increased magnetic field around the conductor. Therefore, an inductor stores energy in its magnetic field.

From (1) above

When there is no current, there is no magnetic field and the stored energy is zero.  Neglecting resistive losses, the energy  (measured in joules, in SI) stored by an inductance with a current  through it is equal to the amount of work required to establish the current through the inductance from zero, and therefore the magnetic field. This is given by:

If the inductance  is constant over the current range, the stored energy is

Inductance is therefore also proportional to the energy stored in the magnetic field for a given current. This energy is stored as long as the current remains constant. If the current decreases, the magnetic field decreases, inducing a voltage in the conductor in the opposite direction, negative at the end through which current enters and positive at the end through which it leaves. This returns stored magnetic energy to the external circuit.

If ferromagnetic materials are located near the conductor, such as in an inductor with a magnetic core, the constant inductance equation above is only valid for linear regions of the magnetic flux, at currents below the level at which the ferromagnetic material saturates, where the inductance is approximately constant. If the magnetic field in the inductor approaches the level at which the core saturates, the inductance begins to change with current, and the integral equation must be used.

Inductive reactance 

When a sinusoidal alternating current (AC) is passing through a linear inductance, the induced back- is also sinusoidal.

Thus the amplitude (peak value) of the voltage across the inductance is

Inductive reactance is the opposition of an inductor to an alternating current.  It is defined analogously to electrical resistance in a resistor, as the ratio of the amplitude (peak value) of the alternating voltage to current in the component

Reactance has units of ohms. It can be seen that inductive reactance of an inductor increases proportionally with frequency , so an inductor conducts less current for a given applied AC voltage as the frequency increases. Because the induced voltage is greatest when the current is increasing, the voltage and current waveforms are out of phase; the voltage peaks occur earlier in each cycle than the current peaks. The phase difference between the current and the induced voltage is  radians or 90 degrees, showing that in an ideal inductor the current lags the voltage by 90°.

Calculating inductance
In the most general case, inductance can be calculated from Maxwell's equations. Many important cases can be solved using simplifications. Where high frequency currents are considered, with skin effect, the surface current densities and magnetic field may be obtained by solving the Laplace equation. Where the conductors are thin wires, self-inductance still depends on the wire radius and the distribution of the current in the wire. This current distribution is approximately constant (on the surface or in the volume of the wire) for a wire radius much smaller than other length scales.

Inductance of a straight single wire
As a practical matter, longer wires have more inductance, and thicker wires have less, analogous to their electrical resistance (although the relationships aren't linear, and are different in kind from the relationships that length and diameter bear to resistance).

Separating the wire from the other parts of the circuit introduces some unavoidable error in any formulas’ results. These inductances are often referred to as “partial inductances”, in part to encourage consideration of the other contributions to whole-circuit inductance which are omitted.

Practical formulas
For derivation of the formulas below, see Rosa (1908).
The total low frequency inductance (interior plus exterior) of a straight wire is:

where 
  is the "low-frequency" or DC inductance in nanohenry (nH or 10−9H),
  is the length of the wire in meters,
  is the radius of the wire in meters (hence a very small decimal number),

The constant 0.75 is just one parameter value among several; different frequency ranges, different shapes, or extremely long wire lengths require a slightly different constant (see below). This result is based on the assumption that the radius  is much less than the length , which is the common case for wires and rods. Disks or thick cylinders have slightly different formulas.

For sufficiently high frequencies skin effects cause the interior currents to vanish, leaving only the currents on the surface of the conductor; the inductance for alternating current,  is then given by a very similar formula:

Mutual inductance of two parallel straight wires
There are two cases to consider:
 Current travels in the same direction in each wire, and
 current travels in opposing directions in the wires.
Currents in the wires need not be equal, though they often are, as in the case of a complete circuit, where one wire is the source and the other the return.

Mutual inductance of two wire loops
This is the generalized case of the paradigmatic two-loop cylindrical coil carrying a uniform low frequency current; the loops are independent closed circuits that can have different lengths, any orientation in space, and carry different currents. Nonetheless, the error terms, which are not included in the integral are only small if the geometries of the loops are mostly smooth and convex: They must not have too many kinks, sharp corners, coils, crossovers, parallel segments, concave cavities, or other topologically "close" deformations. A necessary predicate for the reduction of the 3-dimensional manifold integration formula to a double curve integral is that the current paths be filamentary circuits, i.e. thin wires where the radius of the wire is negligible compared to its length.

The mutual inductance by a filamentary circuit  on a filamentary circuit  is given by the double integral Neumann formula
 

where
  is the permeability of free space
  is a small increment of the wire in circuit 
  is a small increment of the wire in circuit 

Derivation

where
  is the current through the th wire, this current creates the magnetic flux through the th surface
  is the magnetic flux through the ith surface due to the electrical circuit outlined by : 

where

Stokes' theorem has been used for the 3rd equality step. It is actually an approximation step, and is valid only for local circuits made of thin wires.

Self-inductance of a wire loop
Formally, the self-inductance of a wire loop would be given by the above equation with  However, here  becomes infinite, leading to a logarithmically divergent integral.
This necessitates taking the finite wire radius  and the distribution of the current in the wire into account. There remains the contribution from the integral over all points and a correction term,

 

where
  is the radius of the wire 
  is the length of the wire
  is a constant that depends on the distribution of the current in the wire:
  when the current flows on the surface of the wire (total skin effect),
  when the current is evenly over the cross-section of the wire. 
  is an error term whose size depends on the curve of the loop:
  when the loop has sharp corners, and
  when it is a smooth curve.
  Both are small when the wire is long compared to its radius.

Inductance of a solenoid
A solenoid is a long, thin coil; i.e., a coil whose length is much greater than its diameter. Under these conditions, and without any magnetic material used, the magnetic flux density  within the coil is practically constant and is given by

where  is the magnetic constant,  the number of turns,  the current and  the length of the coil. Ignoring end effects, the total magnetic flux through the coil is obtained by multiplying the flux density  by the cross-section area :

When this is combined with the definition of inductance , it follows that the inductance of a solenoid is given by:

Therefore, for air-core coils, inductance is a function of coil geometry and number of turns, and is independent of current.

Inductance of a coaxial cable
Let the inner conductor have radius  and permeability , let the dielectric between the inner and outer conductor have permeability , and let the outer conductor have inner radius , outer radius , and permeability . However, for a typical coaxial line application, we are interested in passing (non-DC) signals at frequencies for which the resistive skin effect cannot be neglected. In most cases, the inner and outer conductor terms are negligible, in which case one may approximate

Inductance of multilayer coils
Most practical air-core inductors are multilayer cylindrical coils with square cross-sections to minimize average distance between turns (circular cross -sections would be better but harder to form).

Magnetic cores
Many inductors include a magnetic core at the center of or partly surrounding the winding. Over a large enough range these exhibit a nonlinear permeability with effects such as magnetic saturation. Saturation makes the resulting inductance a function of the applied current.

The secant or large-signal inductance is used in flux calculations. It is defined as:

The differential or small-signal inductance, on the other hand, is used in calculating voltage. It is defined as:

The circuit voltage for a nonlinear inductor is obtained via the differential inductance as shown by Faraday's Law and the chain rule of calculus.

Similar definitions may be derived for nonlinear mutual inductance.

Mutual inductance

Mutual inductance is defined as the ratio between the EMF induced in one loop or coil by the rate of change of current in another loop or coil.  Mutual inductance is given the symbol .

Derivation of mutual inductance 
The inductance equations above are a consequence of Maxwell's equations. For the important case of electrical circuits consisting of thin wires, the derivation is straightforward.

This equation follows from Ampere's law: magnetic fields and fluxes are linear functions of the currents. By Faraday's law of induction, we have

where  denotes the voltage induced in circuit . This agrees with the definition of inductance above if the coefficients  are identified with the coefficients of inductance. Because the total currents  contribute to  it also follows that  is proportional to the product of turns .

Mutual inductance and magnetic field energy 
Multiplying the equation for vm above with imdt and summing over m gives the energy transferred to the system in the time interval dt,

This must agree with the change of the magnetic field energy, W, caused by the currents. The integrability condition

requires Lm,n = Ln,m. The inductance matrix, Lm,n, thus is symmetric. The integral of the energy transfer is the magnetic field energy as a function of the currents,

This equation also is a direct consequence of the linearity of Maxwell's equations. It is helpful to associate changing electric currents with a build-up or decrease of magnetic field energy. The corresponding energy transfer requires or generates a voltage. A mechanical analogy in the K = 1 case with magnetic field energy (1/2)Li2 is a body with mass M, velocity u and kinetic energy (1/2)Mu2. The rate of change of velocity (current) multiplied with mass (inductance) requires or generates a force (an electrical voltage).

Mutual inductance occurs when the change in current in one inductor induces a voltage in another nearby inductor. It is important as the mechanism by which transformers work, but it can also cause unwanted coupling between conductors in a circuit.

The mutual inductance, is also a measure of the coupling between two inductors. The mutual inductance by circuit  on circuit  is given by the double integral Neumann formula, see calculation techniques

The mutual inductance also has the relationship:

where

Once the mutual inductance, is determined, it can be used to predict the behavior of a circuit:

where

The minus sign arises because of the sense the current  has been defined in the diagram. With both currents defined going into the dots the sign of  will be positive (the equation would read with a plus sign instead).

Coupling coefficient

The coupling coefficient is the ratio of the open-circuit actual voltage ratio to the ratio that would be obtained if all the flux coupled from one magnetic circuit to the other.  The coupling coefficient is related to mutual inductance and self inductances in the following way. From the two simultaneous equations expressed in the two-port matrix the open-circuit voltage ratio is found to be:

where

while the ratio if all the flux is coupled is the ratio of the turns, hence the ratio of the square root of the inductances

thus,

where

The coupling coefficient is a convenient way to specify the relationship between a certain orientation of inductors with arbitrary inductance.

Matrix representation
Mutually coupled inductors can be described by any of the two-port network parameter matrix representations. The most direct are the z parameters, which are given by

Equivalent circuits

T-circuit

Mutually coupled inductors can equivalently be represented by a T-circuit of inductors as shown. If the coupling is strong and the inductors are of unequal values then the series inductor on the step-down side may take on a negative value.

This can be analyzed as a two port network. With the output terminated with some arbitrary impedance, the voltage gain, is given by,

For tightly coupled inductors where  this reduces to

which is independent of the load impedance. If the inductors are wound on the same core and with the same geometry, then this expression is equal to the turns ratio of the two inductors because inductance is proportional to the square of turns ratio.

The input impedance of the network is given by,

For  this reduces to

Thus, current gain,  is not independent of load unless the further condition

is met, in which case,

and

π-circuit

Alternatively, two coupled inductors can be modelled using a π equivalent circuit with optional ideal transformers at each port. While the circuit is more complicated than a T-circuit, it can be generalized to circuits consisting of more than two coupled inductors. Equivalent circuit elements ,  have physical meaning, modelling respectively magnetic reluctances of coupling paths and magnetic reluctances of leakage paths. For example, electric currents flowing through these elements correspond to coupling and leakage magnetic fluxes. Ideal transformers normalize all self-inductances to 1 Henry to simplify mathematical formulas.

Equivalent circuit element values can be calculated from coupling coefficients with

where coupling coefficient matrix and its cofactors are defined as
  and 

For two coupled inductors, these formulas simplify to
  and 

  and

Resonant transformer

When a capacitor is connected across one winding of a transformer, making the winding a tuned circuit (resonant circuit) it is called a single-tuned transformer. When a capacitor is connected across each winding, it is called a double tuned transformer. These resonant transformers can store oscillating electrical energy similar to a resonant circuit and thus function as a bandpass filter, allowing frequencies near their resonant frequency to pass from the primary to secondary winding, but blocking other frequencies. The amount of mutual inductance between the two windings, together with the Q factor of the circuit, determine the shape of the frequency response curve. The advantage of the double tuned transformer is that it can have a wider bandwidth than a simple tuned circuit. The coupling of double-tuned circuits is described as loose-, critical-, or over-coupled depending on the value of the coupling coefficient . When two tuned circuits are loosely coupled through mutual inductance, the bandwidth is narrow. As the amount of mutual inductance increases, the bandwidth continues to grow. When the mutual inductance is increased beyond the critical coupling, the peak in the frequency response curve splits into two peaks, and as the coupling is increased the two peaks move further apart. This is known as overcoupling.

Stongly-coupled self-resonant coils can be used for wireless power transfer between devices in the mid range distances (up to two metres). Strong coupling is required for a high percentage of power transferred, which results in peak splitting of the frequency response.

Ideal transformers
When , the inductor is referred to as being closely coupled. If in addition, the self-inductances go to infinity, the inductor becomes an ideal transformer. In this case the voltages, currents, and number of turns can be related in the following way:

where

Conversely the current:

where

The power through one inductor is the same as the power through the other. These equations neglect any forcing by current sources or voltage sources.

Self-inductance of thin wire shapes

The table below lists formulas for the self-inductance of various simple shapes made of thin cylindrical conductors (wires). In general these are only accurate if the wire radius  is much smaller than the dimensions of the shape, and if no ferromagnetic materials are nearby (no magnetic core).

 is an approximately constant value between 0 and 1 that depends on the distribution of the current in the wire:  when the current flows only on the surface of the wire (complete skin effect),  when the current is evenly spread over the cross-section of the wire (direct current). For round wires, Rosa (1908) gives a formula equivalent to:

where

 is represents small term(s) that have been dropped from the formula, to make it simpler. Read the term  as "plus small corrections that vary on the order of " (see big O notation).

See also
 Electromagnetic induction
 Gyrator
 Hydraulic analogy
 Leakage inductance
 LC circuit, RLC circuit, RL circuit
 Kinetic inductance

Footnotes

References

General references

 
 
 
 
 Küpfmüller K., Einführung in die theoretische Elektrotechnik, Springer-Verlag, 1959.
 Heaviside O., Electrical Papers. Vol.1. – L.; N.Y.: Macmillan, 1892, p. 429-560.
 Fritz Langford-Smith, editor (1953). Radiotron Designer's Handbook, 4th Edition, Amalgamated Wireless Valve Company Pty., Ltd. Chapter 10, "Calculation of Inductance" (pp. 429–448), includes a wealth of formulas and nomographs for coils, solenoids, and mutual inductance.
 F. W. Sears and M. W. Zemansky 1964 University Physics: Third Edition (Complete Volume), Addison-Wesley Publishing Company, Inc. Reading MA, LCCC 63-15265 (no ISBN).

External links
 Clemson Vehicular Electronics Laboratory: Inductance Calculator

Electrodynamics
Physical quantities